The 1967 Nobel Prize in Literature was awarded to the Guatemalan writer Miguel Ángel Asturias (1899–1974) "for his vivid literary achievement, deep-rooted in the national traits and traditions of Indian peoples of Latin America." He is the first Guatemalan and the second Latin American author to receive the prize after the Chilean poet Gabriela Mistral won in 1945.

Laureate

Miguel Angel Asturias first book Leyendas de Guatemala ("Legends of Guatemala", 1930) is a compilation of stories originating from Mayan legends. His debut novel El Señor Presidente ("The President", 1946) was a brutal portrayal of a Latin American dictatorship in the early 20th century. He wrote a trilogy – The Banana Trilogy – about the rampage of the United Fruit Company in Guatemala in the 1950s, which included Viento Fuerte ("Strong Wind", 1950), El Papa Verde ("The Green Pope", 1954), and Los ojos de los enterrados ("The Eyes of the Interred", 1960). The works of Asturias are pervaded with social pathos and a potent language that fuses myth and reality, and are generally concerned with repression and injustice against the poor and the weak, both in Guatemala and the rest of Latin America. His other well-known works include Hombres de maíz ("Men of Maize", 1949) and Mulata de tal ("The Mulatta and Mr. Fly", 1963).

Deliberations

Nominations
Miguel Ángel Asturias was first nominated in 1964 by Erik Lindegren, a member of the Swedish Academy, and became an annual nominee until 1967 when he was eventually awarded with the prize. He received 3 nominations in 1967 with a single joint nomination with Argentinian writer Jorge Luis Borges.

In total, the Nobel Committee received 112 nominations for 69 individuals including Samuel Beckett, Thornton Wilder, Lawrence Durrell, E. M. Forster, Georges Simenon, Ezra Pound, Robert Graves, André Malraux and J. R. R. Tolkien. Eighteen of the nominees were nominated first-time such as Ivan Drach, Carlos Drummond de Andrade, Rabbe Enckell, Saul Bellow (awarded in 1976), Jorge Amado, György Lukács, Claude Simon (awarded in 1985), Pavlo Tychyna, and Hans Magnus Enzensberger. The highest number of nominations was for the Spanish writer José María Pemán with eight nominations from academics and literary critics. The oldest nominee was the Spanish philologist Ramón Menéndez Pidal (aged 98) and the youngest was Ukrainian poet Ivan Drach (aged 31). Five of the nominees were women namely Katherine Anne Porter, Marie Luise Kaschnitz, Lina Kostenko, Anna Seghers and Judith Wright.

The authors Djamaluddin Adinegoro, Marcel Aymé, Margaret Ayer Barnes, Vladimir Bartol, Ion Buzdugan, Ilya Ehrenburg, Forough Farrokhzad, Sidney Bradshaw Fay, Hugo Gernsback, João Guimarães Rosa, Langston Hughes, Lajos Kassák, Patrick Kavanagh, Margaret Kennedy, José Martínez Ruiz, André Maurois, Carson McCullers, Christopher Okigbo, Dorothy Parker, Arthur Ransome, Elmer Rice, Georges Sadoul, Siegfried Sassoon, Alice B. Toklas, Jean Toomer, David Unaipon, Robert van Gulik, Adrienne von Speyr, and Vernon Watkins died in 1967 without having been nominated for the prize. The Ukrainian poet Pavlo Tychyna died months before the announcement.

Prize decision
Asturias was shortlisted along with Jorge Luis Borges, Graham Greene, W.H. Auden and Yasunari Kawabata (awarded in 1968). Anders Österling, chairman of the Swedish Academy's Nobel committee, favored Graham Greene whom he descried as "an accomplished observer whose experience encompasses a global diversity of external environments, and above all the mysterious aspects of the inner world, human conscience, anxiety and nightmares", but was opposed by other members of the committee. A shared prize to Asturias and Borges was proposed by the opposition with Auden as their second proposal, but ultimately Asturias alone was awarded. Despite Asturias winning the prize, Österling regarded him as a writer "too narrowly limited in his revolutionary subject world" and Borges as "too exclusive or artificial in his ingenious miniature art".

References

External links
Ceremony speech by Anders Österling nobelprize.org
1967 Documentary nobelprize.org

1967